Nichole de Carle is a British fashion designer best known for her lingerie and swimwear brand of the same name.

Personal life
De Carle was born in Leicestershire. She graduated with a BA in Contour Fashion from De Montfort University in 2005. She has two sisters. Her sister Charlotte de Carle became a fashion model after modelling lingerie for Nichole.

Career
De Carle worked for fashion designers Alexander McQueen and Donna Karan before starting her eponymous fashion brand (also known as NDCL) in October 2009. The brand produces bondage-themed lingerie and underwear, drawing inspiration from things such as architecture. Her 2011 "White Diamond" knickers featured a 0.1 carat diamond and received significant press coverage due to the £232 price.

In 2012 De Carle organised a charity calendar featuring British female sporting celebrities, raising money for the Wellbeing of Women charity.

The brand is often worn by celebrities, particularly during live performances, including Beyoncé, Jessie J, Nicole Scherzinger, Cheryl Cole and Paloma Faith.

Television
De Carle featured in episode 3 of E4 reality talent competition Great British Hairdresser. She also appeared in episode 4 of reality show Dirty Sexy Things.

Awards
The brand was nominated for the 2011 UK Lingerie Awards in the "Independent Directional Brand" category.

References

External links
 

Living people
British fashion designers
Lingerie brands
Swimwear brands
Alumni of De Montfort University
1984 births